Queen to Play (original title Joueuse, the feminine form of “player”) is a 2009 French-German film directed by Caroline Bottaro. It is based on the novel La Joueuse d’échecs by Bertina Henrichs.

Synopsis
The film stars Sandrine Bonnaire as a French chambermaid on the island of Corsica.  She develops an interest in chess.  She has been cleaning the house of an American doctor (played by Kevin Kline in his first French-speaking role), and he begins helping her practice and improve.  She must deal with her growing fascination with the game and with her husband and teenaged daughter.

Cast
 Sandrine Bonnaire as Hélène
 Kevin Kline as Kröger
 Valérie Lagrange as Maria
 Francis Renaud as Ange
 Alexandra Gentil as Lisa
 Alice Pol as Natalia
 Didier Ferrari as Jacky
 Laurence Colussi as Pina
 Élisabeth Vitali as Marie-Jeanne
 Daniel Martin as The President of the Chess Club
 Dominic Gould as L'Américain
 Jennifer Beals as L'Américaine

Awards
2010: Special Mention for John Schlesinger Award for Outstanding First Feature Palm Springs International Film Festival
2009: Official Selection Tribeca Film Festival

Release
The film had its world premiere on April 25, 2009 in both New York City and Los Angeles, at the Tribeca Film Festival and the ColCoa Film Festival respectively. The national release in France was on August 5, 2009 and in Germany on January 7, 2010. The film is distributed in the U.S. by Zeitgeist Films and was released there on April 1, 2011.

References

External links
 Queen To Play at Zeitgeist Films
 
 
 Queen To Play at Video Detective
 Joueuse at StudioCanal
 Variety.com review
 Interview with Caroline Bottaro on indieWIRE
 Queen To Play Goes to Zeitgeist Films for U.S. Distribution on indieWiRE

2000s French-language films
English-language French films
2009 comedy-drama films
2009 films
Films set in Corsica
Films shot in Corsica
Films about chess
Films based on French novels
Films based on German novels
2009 directorial debut films
French comedy-drama films
Films scored by Nicola Piovani
2000s French films